Jahez is a 2012 Pakistani social drama television serial directed by Babar Javed, written by Amna Mufti and produced by A&B Entertainment. The drama stars Hina Dilpazeer, Abid Ali and Faysal Qureshi in lead roles, and was first aired on 9 February 2012 on Geo Entertainment.

Plot summary 
The series focuses on the social issues surrounding the dowry system, with the main character endeavouring to give her son a great future despite the many hardships she faces. It centers on the life of a couple who fulfill the need of dowry for their daughters with the help of their son.

Cast

Hina Dilpazeer as Badar-un-Nisa "Baddo"
Abid Ali as Baddo's husband
Faysal Qureshi as Sheikhoo
Jana Malik as Saira
Uroosa Siddiqui as Sana
Fizza Zehra as Hina
Sadia Ghaffar as Nida
Tehreem Zuberi as Afsheen
Shahid Naqvi as Babu Bhai
Hajra Khan as Roshaney
Aamir Qureshi as Atif
Noshaba Javed as Saira's Mother
Shehzad Mukhtar Saira's Father
Gul e Rana
Beenish Chohan
Afshan Qureshi

Awards and nominations

References

2012 Pakistani television series debuts